"Take Over Control" is a song by Dutch producer and DJ Afrojack, featuring vocals from Dutch singer Eva Simons. The song was written by Afrojack, Mike Hamilton, Simons and Ingrid Simons. It was released as a single in the Netherlands on 12 August 2010. The song was a number-one single for six weeks on Billboard's Dance/Mix Show Airplay. The song is also Afrojack's first single ever to enter the Billboard Hot 100, peaking at number 41.

Music video
The music video, directed by Alex Herron, was shot on 14 September 2010 in Los Angeles and Death Valley, California. The video premiered on YouTube on 12 October 2010 through the Spinnin' Records account, and later shown to the British public on 20 October 2010 through the Data Records account.

The video starts with Afrojack driving an Audi R8 in a desert. Simons, depicted as a robotic dancer in a quite stereotypical yellow American school bus, is accompanied by four robotic background dancers. They step out of the bus and perform a high-energy dance routine in a desert aircraft boneyard, with Simons framed in an L-1011 Rolls-Royce RB211 engine cowling. The girls take control of the field, but fall out of energy, and Afrojack arrives and plugs them in so that they can continue performing.

Track listings and formats
Digital download
"Take Over Control" (Radio Edit) – 3:28
"Take Over Control" (Extended Vocal Mix) – 6:56

Digital maxi single
"Take Over Control" (Radio Edit) – 3:28
"Take Over Control" (Extended Vocal Mix) – 6:56
"Take Over Control" (Extended Vocal Instrumental) – 6:56

UK digital EP
"Take Over Control" (UK Radio Edit) – 2:57
"Take Over Control" (Adam F. Vocal Edit) – 2:53
"Take Over Control" (Extended Vocal Mix) – 6:56
"Take Over Control" (Ian Carey Remix) – 6:47
"Take Over Control" (Adam F. Remix) – 3:37
"Take Over Control" (Drumsound & Bassline Smith Mix) – 3:46

UK single
"Take Over Control" (UK Radio Edit) – 2:57
"Take Over Control" (Adam F. Vocal Edit) – 2:53

US CD maxi single
"Take Over Control" (Radio Edit) – 3:38
"Take Over Control" (Dutch Radio Edit) – 3:28
"Take Over Control" (Extended Vocal Mix) – 6:56
"Take Over Control" (Adam F. Mix) – 3:34
"Take Over Control" (Drumsound & Bassline Smith Mix) – 3:44
"Take Over Control" (Spencer & Hill Mix) – 6:10
"Take Over Control" (Apster Mix) – 5:34
"Take Over Control" (Sunnery James & Ryan Marciano Mix) – 6:08
"Take Over Control" (Ian Carey Mix) – 6:45
"Take Over Control" (Dj Fuel Mix) – 3:57

Charts and certifications

Weekly charts

Year-end charts

Certifications

Release history

References

2010 singles
Afrojack songs
Eva Simons songs
House music songs
Songs written by Afrojack
Ministry of Sound singles
Songs written by Eva Simons
2010 songs
Spinnin' Records singles